David D. King may refer to:
 David King (footballer, born 1985), Australian rules footballer
 David D. King (jurist), New Hampshire judge

See also
 David King (disambiguation)